Sphodrus leucophthalmus is a species of ground beetle native to Europe.

References

Sphodrus
Beetles described in 1758
Taxa named by Carl Linnaeus
Beetles of Europe